Dmytro Heyko (born 10 January 2000) is a professional Ukrainian football defender who plays for German Mittelrheinliga club Blau-Weiß Friesdorf.

Career
Born in Odesa, Heyko is a product of the local Chornomorets Odesa youth sportive school system.

In July 2018 he was promoted to the Chornomorets Odesa main squad. He made his debut as a start squad player for Chornomorets in the Ukrainian First League in an away drawing match against FC Alians Lypova Dolyna on 20 November 2020.

References

External links
Statistics at UAF website (Ukr)

2000 births
Living people
Footballers from Odesa
Ukrainian footballers
Association football defenders
FC Chornomorets Odesa players
FC Chornomorets-2 Odesa players
FC Balkany Zorya players
Ukrainian First League players
Ukrainian Second League players
Oberliga (football) players
Ukrainian expatriate footballers
Expatriate footballers in Germany
Ukrainian expatriate sportspeople in Germany